The Metropolis Management Act 1855 (18 & 19 Vict. c.120) was an Act of the Parliament of the United Kingdom that created the Metropolitan Board of Works, a London-wide body to co-ordinate the construction of the city's infrastructure. The Act also created a second tier of local government consisting of parish vestries and district boards of works. The Metropolitan Board of Works was the forerunner of the London County Council.

Background
The Royal Commission on the City of London considered the case for creation of an authority for the whole of London. Its report recommended the creation of a limited-function Metropolitan Board of Works and seven municipal corporations based on existing parliamentary representation.

The Metropolitan Board of Works
The act constituted the Metropolitan Board of Works and provided that its members should be chosen by the parish vestries and district boards also constituted by the act. The first election of members was to take place on 12 December 1855. From 1857, one third of the board was to go out of office on the third Wednesday of June every year. The board was to take over the powers, duties and liabilities of the Metropolitan Commission of Sewers and the Metropolitan Buildings Office on 1 January 1856. Its area of responsibility was to be that designated by the Registrar General as London in the 1851 census.

Vestries and district boards
The second tier of local government was to be based on the existing vestries of civil parishes in an area comprising parts of the counties of Middlesex, Kent and Surrey.

Section 42 of the Act dealt with the incorporation of vestries and district boards.

Where single parishes became a local authority they were to have the title:

Where parishes were grouped the resulting authority took the title:

List of vestries, district boards and number of members elected to the Metropolitan Board of Works

A number of extra-parochial places lay within the Metropolitan Board of Works' area but were not included in any district:
 Inner Temple
 Middle Temple
 London Charterhouse
 Close of the Collegiate Church of St Peter (i.e. Westminster Abbey)
 Furnival's Inn
 Gray's Inn
 Lincoln's Inn
 Staple Inn

Changes in later legislation
In 1886, the Fulham District Board of Works was dissolved and the two parish vestries of Fulham and Hammersmith became local authorities. Fulham Vestry continued to use the existing town hall at Walham Green, while Hammersmith Vestry built a town hall at Hammersmith Broadway.

In 1889, the Local Government Act replaced the Metropolitan Board of Works with the London County Council, and the area of the board became the County of London. From that date, the various parishes were separated from Middlesex, Kent and Surrey and placed for all purposes in the new county, while the vestries and district boards continued to function under the aegis of the new county council.

In 1894, the Hackney District Board of Works was dissolved, with the vestries of Hackney and Stoke Newington assuming the powers of the district board. Stoke Newington Vestry built a town hall at 126 Church Street. At the same time, the Vestry of the Parish of Plumstead became a separate authority, with the remaining four parishes of Plumstead District being reconstituted as Lee District Board of Works.

In 1896, the parishes of Southwark St Olave and St Thomas were combined as a civil parish.

In 1900, metropolitan boroughs created by the London Government Act replaced the vestries and district boards.

Repeal
, the majority of the Act has been repealed with only sections 239 and 240 remaining in force. Section 239 deals with the maintenance of enclosed gardens and section 240 relates to obligations under the Crown Estate Paving Act 1851.

References

Sources
 Metropolis Local Management Bill, Hansard

Citations

External links
 

United Kingdom Acts of Parliament 1855
Local government legislation in England and Wales
History of local government in London (1855–1889)
Acts of the Parliament of the United Kingdom concerning London
1855 in London
Metropolitan Board of Works